Chief Theophilus Adeleke Akinyele (29 February 1932 – 26 October 2020) was a Nigerian business consultant and civil servant.

Career
Akinyele was born in Ibadan. He obtained a BA from the University College Ibadan, (now the University of Ibadan) in 1959. He also studied at Oxford University, University of Connecticut and Harvard Business School.

He served as Permanent Secretary in the Ministries of Agriculture and Finance of the old Western State of Nigeria, Registrar and Secretary to the Council of the University of Ife (now Obafemi Awolowo University), Ile-Ife Nigeria, Secretary to the Military Government and Head of the Civil Service of Oyo State and also as the Director of Budget and Special Adviser on Budget Affairs to President Shehu Shagari from 1979 to 1983.  After retiring from public service, Akinyele worked as a consultant.

He held the chieftaincy title of Bobajiro of Ibadan land and was an Officer of the Order of the Niger.

References

External links
Nigerian National Planning Commission
2003 Elections in Nigeria

University of Ibadan alumni
Alumni of the University of Oxford
University of Connecticut alumni
Harvard Business School alumni
Officers of the Order of the Niger
People from Ibadan
Obafemi Awolowo University people
Yoruba people
Nigerian expatriates in the United States
Nigerian expatriates in the United Kingdom
1932 births
2020 deaths